In abstract algebra, a cellular algebra is a finite-dimensional associative algebra A with a distinguished cellular basis  which is particularly well-adapted to studying the representation theory of A.

History 
The cellular algebras discussed in this article were introduced in a 1996 paper of Graham and Lehrer.  However, the terminology had previously been used by Weisfeiler and Lehman in the Soviet Union in the 1960s, to describe what are also known as coherent algebras.

Definitions 

Let  be a fixed commutative ring with unit. In most applications this is a field, but this is not needed for the definitions. Let also  be an -algebra.

The concrete definition 

 A finite partially ordered set .
 For every  a non-empty finite set  of indices.
 An injective map

and satisfying the following conditions:
  for all elements of the basis.
 For every ,  and every  the equation

This definition was originally given by Graham and Lehrer who invented cellular algebras.

The more abstract definition 

A cell ideal of  w.r.t.  is a two-sided ideal  such that the following conditions hold:
 .
 There is a left ideal  that is free as a -module and an isomorphism

A cell chain for  w.r.t.  is defined as a direct decomposition

into free -submodules such that
 
  is a two-sided ideal of 
  is a cell ideal of  w.r.t. to the induced involution.

Now  is called a cellular algebra if it has a cell chain. One can show that the two definitions are equivalent.

Examples

Polynomial examples 

 is cellular.
  with the reverse of the natural ordering.
 
 

A cell-chain in the sense of the second, abstract definition is given by

Matrix examples 

 is cellular.
 
 
 For the basis one chooses  the standard matrix units, i.e.  is the matrix with all entries equal to zero except the (s,t)-th entry which is equal to 1.

A cell-chain (and in fact the only cell chain) is given by
 

In some sense all cellular algebras "interpolate" between these two extremes by arranging matrix-algebra-like pieces according to the poset .

Further examples 

This includes for example the integral group algebra of the symmetric groups as well as all other finite Weyl groups.

A basic Brauer tree algebra over a field is cellular if and only if the Brauer tree is a straight line (with arbitrary number of exceptional vertices).

Further examples include q-Schur algebras, the Brauer algebra, the Temperley–Lieb algebra, the Birman–Murakami–Wenzl algebra, the blocks of the Bernstein–Gelfand–Gelfand category  of a semisimple Lie algebra.

Representations

Cell modules and the invariant bilinear form 

Then one defines the cell module  as the free -module with basis  and multiplication

where the coefficients  are the same as above. Then  becomes an -left module.

These modules generalize the Specht modules for the symmetric group and the Hecke-algebras of type A.

There is a canonical bilinear form  which satisfies

for all indices .

One can check that  is symmetric in the sense that

for all  and also -invariant in the sense that

for all ,.

Simple modules 

Assume for the rest of this section that the ring  is a field. With the information contained in the invariant bilinear forms one can easily list all simple -modules:

Let  and define  for all . Then all  are absolute simple -modules and every simple -module is one of these.

These theorems appear already in the original paper by Graham and Lehrer.

Properties of cellular algebras

Persistence properties 

 Tensor products of finitely many cellular -algebras are cellular.
 A -algebra  is cellular if and only if its opposite algebra  is.
 Direct products of finitely many cellular -algebras are cellular.

If  is an integral domain then there is a converse to this last point:
 If  is a finite-dimensional -algebra with an involution and  a decomposition in two-sided, -invariant ideals, then the following are equivalent:
  is cellular.
 Tits' deformation theorem for cellular algebras: Let  be a cellular -algebra. Then the following holds: If  is semisimple, then  is also semisimple.

If one further assumes  to be a local domain, then additionally the following holds:

Other properties 

Then the following hold 
  is split, i.e. all simple modules are absolutely irreducible.
 The following are equivalent:
  is semisimple.
  is split semisimple.
  is simple.
  is nondegenerate.
 The following are equivalent:
  is quasi-hereditary (i.e. its module category is a highest-weight category).
 .
 All cell chains of  have the same length.
 .
In particular  is cellular (to some involution) if and only if its basic algebra is.
If  then in fact every equivalence class contains an -invariant idempotent.

References

Algebras
Representation theory